Alfred Edward Howson Wood (25 October 1945 – 10 April 2020) was an English footballer who played for Manchester City, Shrewsbury Town, Millwall, Hull City, Middlesbrough, Walsall and Stafford Rangers.

He died in April 2020 at the age of 74. He had been living with dementia for 12 years.

References

1945 births
2020 deaths
Sportspeople from Macclesfield
English footballers
Association football forwards
Manchester City F.C. players
Shrewsbury Town F.C. players
Millwall F.C. players
Hull City A.F.C. players
Middlesbrough F.C. players
Walsall F.C. players
Stafford Rangers F.C. players
English Football League players